A  (plural:) is a toasted open-face sandwich made of a sliced baguette or other long roll of bread, topped with sautéed white mushrooms, cheese and sometimes other ingredients such as ham. Served hot with ketchup, it has been a popular street food in Poland since the 1970s.

Etymology 
The Polish word  comes from the verb , which means "to bake a dish so that its ingredients combine, and a crispy, browned crust forms on top," and may refer to various casseroles and other foods prepared in this manner.

Preparation and varieties 

A typical  is made from one half of a baguette, or any other long roll of white bread, cut lengthwise, as for a submarine sandwich. The bread is topped with sliced, sautéed white mushrooms and grated cheese to form an open-face sandwich, which is then toasted until the bread becomes crisp and the cheese melts. Hard, mature yellow cheese with high fat content that melts well in heat, such as Gouda, Edam, Emmental, Tilsit or Cheddar, is best for this purpose; Polish smoked sheep milk cheese, such as oscypek, is also a popular choice. A zapiekanka is best served hot. The typical garnish is tomato ketchup, usually splattered on the cheese in a generous amount.

 are available throughout Poland in many varieties and levels of quality. Frozen ones, reheated in a microwave oven, are usually soggy and tasteless. Some oven-baked , on the other hand, are available with a lavish choice of additional ingredients and sauces, which has earned them the moniker of "Polish pizza". Varieties include "diablo" with bacon, pickled cucumbers and spicy sauce; "Gypsy" with ham and sweet and sour sauce; "Greek" with olives and feta cheese; and "Hawaiian" with pineapple and barbecue sauce; patrons may also choose their own combinations.

History 

 first appeared in the streets of Polish towns in the 1970s. Under Edward Gierek's leadership of the Polish United Workers' Party, Poland's Communist authorities allowed a degree of private enterprise in the catering industry. Their spread continued during the food shortages of the following decade. They usually took the form of stands or travel trailers turned food trucks serving  along with simple dishes of Polish cuisine, such as  sausage, boiled ham hock or tripe soup, and American fast food staples, like hot dogs, hamburgers and French fries. 

Demand for  fell with the reintroduction of the market economy in the 1990s, but they were still served by the few "small gastronomies" that survived the competition with large fast food chains.

See also
Polish cuisine
Pizza

Notes

References

Sources

External links 
 Guilty Pleasures: Regional Fast Foods from Poland

Polish cuisine
Street food
Baked goods
Cheese sandwiches
Open-faced sandwiches
Hot sandwiches